Jacob Weinroth (August 2, 1947 – October 16, 2018) was an Israeli attorney specializing in litigation. He was the founding partner of Dr. J. Weinroth & Co. Law Office.

Biography
Jacob Weinroth was born in a displaced persons camp in Ansbach, Germany. His parents were Polish Jews who had escaped to the Soviet Union during World War II. His family moved to Israel in 1949 and settled in  Netanya. He studied at Rav Amiel Yeshiva "New Yishuv" in Tel Aviv and later at the Ponevezh Yeshiva in Bnei Brak followed by the Mir Yeshiva in Jerusalem.  He was ordained as a Rabbi by Rabbi Shmuel Rozovski, Rabbi Dovid Povarsky and the Head Rabbi of Jerusalem Rabbi Bezalel Zolti. He did his regular service in the Israel Defense Forces in the infantry, and later did reserve duty in the Military Advocate General’s Corps.

Weinroth studied law at Tel Aviv University. He received a BA with honors in 1972, an MA with honors in 1974, and a PhD in 1981. His doctoral thesis, titled "The Law of the Rebellious wife", dealt with ways to enforce husbands to divorce their wives that will be valid according to Jewish Halakha which is the state law in Israel on matrimonial matters. His thesis included a bill proposal that was later passed as a law in the Knesset: Rabbinical courts law (enforcing court orders for divorce) 1995. The law, which was approved by leading Rabbis, improved the situations of women in divorce processes and is still called the "Weinroth law". The doctoral thesis is based on an argument presented by Weinroth in the upper Rabbinical court of appeals.

Weinroth lived in Ramat Gan and was married to Belgium-born Giselle. He was the father of six children. His brother Dr. Avraham Weinroth is a senior partner in the firm. Two of his sons also work in the firm.

Weinroth died of cancer on October 16, 2018, at age 71. He had developed cancer the previous year, but continued working almost to his last day.

Legal career
In 1972, Weinroth established the firm Dr. J. Weinroth & Co. Law Office and remained an active partner there until his death. He served as a lecturer in the Tel Aviv University Faculty of Law from 1974 to his death in 2018, and also served as a lecturer in the Tel Aviv University Philosophy school. Weinroth specializes in white collar and civil litigation and was considered by many as one of Israel's leading litigators. He represented many high profile personalities in the political arena, among them  Prime Minister Benjamin Netanyahu in the "Bar On Hebron" and the "Amedi" cases, former Israeli Chief of Staff Major General. Rafael Eitan, former Minister of Finance Meir Sheetrit, former President Ezer Weizman and others. He is famous for taking on cases without political prejudice. He represented Margalit Har Shefi (an acquaintance of Yizhak Rabin's killer Yigal Amir) in the Supreme Court and was one of the lawyers that represented the Jewish Underground in 1984–1985. On the other side of the political spectrum he represented former Minister Salah Tarif, and Knesset member Ahmad Tibi.

In 1991, Weinroth was approached about possibly serving as a judge on the Supreme Court, but turned down the offer. He was a member of the Tal Committee, which  dealt with the military draft of Ultra-Orthodox Jews and the Ivry Commission on the civil service.

On 31 December 2009, he was indicted for bribery and money laundering. He was tried in the Tel Aviv District Court. On 31 October 2011, the court cleared him of all charges.

Weinroth was a member of the defense team of Israeli Foreign Minister Avigdor Lieberman, who was tried for corruption and acquitted in November 2013.

Published works
Company Liquidation in Israel with Judge S. Luvenberg o.b.m., 1978.

See also
Israeli judicial system
Israeli law

References

External links
Jacob Weinroth, Human limitations – Man, Rule and Chance (Hebrew)
Gidi Weiss, Dr J. Weinroth: Corruption and Wealth are Political Rule, appeared in Haaretz April 30th, 2008
Yair Shapira, The Legal Battle of his Life, appeared in Besheva,  January 28th, 2010
Jacob Weinroth's page on Martindale

Israeli lawyers
Israeli Jews
Israeli legal scholars
Israeli Orthodox Jews
1947 births
2018 deaths
People named in the Panama Papers
Deaths from cancer in Israel
People from Ansbach